The East Riding County Football Association is the governing body of football in the historic East Riding of Yorkshire (pre-1974), England. It runs a number of county cup competitions at different levels for its affiliated teams.

History and organisation

Before the formation of the County, football in the area was under the jurisdiction of a Hull & District FA and the Scarborough & East Riding FA.

On 10 February 1902, the Football Association issued ‘the Recommendations of a Commission appointed to enquire into the position of the Yorkshire Associations’. The recommendations came into effect on 1 May 1902 forming the new East Riding of Yorkshire FA – “the area to be the East Riding of York. The present Hull and District Association to change its name and take control of the area.”

During the last 100 years, the County has administered football in the area with the stewardship in the hands of volunteers, with a steady increase in the number of clubs, but very few landmarks – the foremost possibly being the introduction of Sunday football in the early fifties.

However, the FA led expansion of football at all levels has seen dramatic changes in recent years. For the first time an office was set up with full-time paid staff – previously being administered from officers’ homes.

The Association became a Limited Company in 1999 and in 2001 a full-time Football Development Officer appointed.

The ECRFA are in the process of completing their new Headquarters built at Inglemire Lane.

Affiliated leagues

Men's Saturday Leagues
Humber Premier League
East Riding Amateur League
East Riding County League
Driffield and District League

Men's Sunday Leagues
Hull Sunday Men's League

Ladies and Girls Leagues
East Riding Women's League
East Riding Girls Football League

Youth Leagues
East Yorkshire Junior League
Hull Boys Sunday Football League

Other Leagues
Hull and District Veterans League
East Riding Pan Disability League

Source

Small Sided Leagues

Beverley Leisure Centre
Beverley Soccer Sixes
Bransholme Soccer Sixes (Champion Soccer)
Bridlington 5-a-side (Football Mundial)

Driffield Soccer Sixes (Champion Soccer)
Hull Corporate 6 a side (Football Mundial)
- Hull University 
- Kelvin Hall High School

Hull City Fives
Hull Grassroots
North Ferriby Soccer Sixes (Champion Soccer)
Warners

Source

Disbanded or amalgamated leagues

Leagues that were affiliated to the East Riding County FA but have disbanded or amalgamated with other leagues include:

Driffield and District Minor League
East Riding Church League
South Holderness League

The East Riding County FA was founded in 1902, there was a ‘Scarborough and East Riding FA’ for 20 years before that.

THE EAST YORKSHIRE FOOTBALL ASSOCIATION WOLDS LEAGUE CUP 1902-03  
WOLDS DISTRICT LEAGUE. A special meeting of the executive of the Wolds District (Association) League was held at Middleton, on

Saturday night, the Rev. F. Castallane in the chair. Mr. R. B. Soanes was elected hon. secretary, in the room of the Rev. J. Hare, who is leaving the district. Mr. Hugh Brooksbank, who has given a cup for competition, declined to have it named after him, and it was therefore decided to call it the Middleton and District Cup, The first round of the Cup-ties was to have been played on Saturday, but was postponed on account of the hard state of the ground.

Affiliated member clubs

Among the notable clubs that are affiliated to the East Riding County FA are:

Bridlington Town
Goole

Hall Road Rangers
Hessle Rangers

Hull City
Hull United

North Ferriby United
Westella & Willerby

County Cup competitions

The East Riding County FA run the following Cup Competitions:

Alf Bolder Memorial Youth U16 Cup
David Whitton Memorial Trophy
ERCFA Women's Cup
Frank Varey/Dr Lilley U18s Cup
Intermediate Country Cup
Intermediate Cup

Junior Country Cup
President's Cup
Qualifying Country Cup
Qualifying Cup
Senior Country Cup
Senior Cup (Sponsored By Truckexport)

Tesco Cup – Under 13s Boys
Tesco Cup – Under 14s Girls
Tesco Cup – Under 16s Girls
Treasurer's Cup
Vice President's Cup

Source

List of recent East Riding County Cup Winners

Source – The "Country" cups are only open to those clubs outside the boundaries of the city of Hull.

Key officials

Adam Lowthorpe (Chief Executive)
Graham Turner (County Development Manager)

References

External links
East Riding County FA official website

County football associations
Football in the East Riding of Yorkshire

Sports organizations established in 1902